This is the comprehensive list of all unclimbed mountains of Nepal.

References

Nepal
Climbing and mountaineering-related lists
Mountains, unclimbed